Queen Elizabeth Park is the name of:

 Queen Elizabeth Park, Kapiti Coast, New Zealand
 Queen Elizabeth Park, Masterton, New Zealand
 Queen Elizabeth Park, British Columbia, Canada
 Queen Elizabeth National Park, Uganda
 Queen Elizabeth Park, North Saskatchewan River valley parks system, Edmonton, Canada
 Queen Elizabeth Park, Glace Bay, Nova Scotia, Canada
 Queen Elizabeth Park Concord, New South Wales Australia

See also
 Queen Elizabeth Olympic Park, London, UK
 Queen Elizabeth Provincial Park, Alberta, Canada
 Queen Elizabeth II Wildlands Provincial Park, Ontario, Canada
 Queen Elizabeth II Park, site of former sports stadium, New Zealand
 Queen Elizabeth Park Road, Edmonton, Canada